MC Malsawmzuala (born 23 December 1993) is an Indian professional footballer who plays as a forward.

Career 
Malsawmzuala finished as the top-scorer in 2018–19 Mizoram Premier League while playing for Chhinga Veng F.C. having found the net 12 times. He was signed by Aizawl F.C. in December 2020. He made his professional debut for the Aizawl against Gokulam Kerala F.C. on 4 January 2020, He was brought in as substitute in the 71st minute as Aizawl drew 1–1.

Career statistics

References

External links
Profile

1993 births
Living people
People from Saiha
Indian footballers
Aizawl FC players  
Footballers from Mizoram
I-League players
Association football forwards
Chanmari FC players
Chhinga Veng FC players
Mizoram Premier League players
Sreenidi Deccan FC players